PCS Stamps & Coins, formerly known as the Postal Commemorative Society, markets a variety of heirloom collectibles. It is the world's largest philatelic organization. Products include collectibles that contain U.S. silver dollars, other historic U.S. coins, State Quarters, mint condition U.S. stamps, and U.S. paper money.  They have a 30-day unconditional return policy.

The company is headquartered in Norwalk, Connecticut.

History 

Postal Commemorative Society ("PCS") was first formed in 1970 as a division of MBI. Its first product was U.S. first day of issue covers.

In 1973, MBI was still a subsidiary of Glendinning Companies. It consisted of two divisions, Postal Commemorative Society and The Danbury Mint. In December 1975, MBI ended all its legal ties with Glendinning Companies and became an independent business. Easton Press was formed in 1975 as MBI's third division.

In 2006, Postal Commemorative Society changed its name to PCS Stamps & Coins to reflect the shift in its product offers.

References

External links
PCS Stamps & Co
ins homepage

Philatelic organizations based in the United States
Numismatic associations
Organizations based in Connecticut
Coin retailers
Mail-order retailers